The Royal Canadian Armoured Corps (RCAC) is the armoured corps within the Canadian Army, including 3 Regular and 18 Reserve Force regiments, as well as the Royal Canadian Armoured Corps School.

The corps was formed as the Canadian Armoured Corps in 1940, within the Canadian Army (Active). In August 1945, it was given its "royal" designation, and following the Second World War, several Reserve Force units were incorporated into the corps. From 1968 until 2013, it was officially named the Armoured Branch.

History

Pre-1940 

Originally formed as the Canadian Cavalry Corps in 1910, Canada's first tank units were not raised until late in 1918. Initially these units were considered to be part of the Machine Gun Corps and the 1st Canadian Tank Battalion, 2nd Canadian Tank Battalion and the 3e Bataillon de chars d'assaut were all too late to join the fighting in the First World War. However, the 1st Canadian Tank Battalion was still training in Mark V tanks in the U.K. when the Canadian Tank Corps was finally authorized two days after the armistice. It seems like tanks were forgotten by the Cavalry after the war. Although, in the 1930s there were some small attempts at mechanization with motorcycles, experimental armoured cars and the purchase of a few tracked Carden-Loyd machine gun carriers for training. However, the first tanks since the First World War did not arrive until a few machine gun armed Vickers Mark VI light tanks appeared just one year before Canada went to war with Germany again.

Regimental Heritage 

Canadian armoured regiments split their heritage between two primary sources. The first being the cavalry corps, from which many armoured regiments were created and in fact the first "armoured" regiments were titled "mechanized cavalry" regiments, and the second being the tank corps (which formerly belonged to first the infantry and then the machine gun corps). This began in 1936 with the creation of tank battalions and continued on from 1940 when many other types of regiment were mobilized as armoured units for the Second World War.

The Second World War 
From these modest beginnings the modern Canadian Armoured Corps began on 13 August 1940 with Major-General (then Colonel) F. F. Worthington as its first colonel-commandant. Over the course of the war from 1939 to 1944, the Armoured Corps gradually took over responsibilities from other Corps, such as Tank Regiments all being converted to Armoured Regiments, the transition of infantry reconnaissance battalions to the Armoured Corps, as well as anti-armour responsibilities from the Artillery Corps. Towards the close of the Second World War, the Corps was subsequently bestowed the honour of the 'Royal' designation by King George VI in 1945.

Initially its equipment was 219 US M1917 tanks – a First World War design – obtained at scrap prices. They were sufficient for some training and familiarisation, but otherwise of very limited combat use. To form the 1st Army Tank Brigade, Valentine tanks were ordered. This British design was to be built in Canada. Aside from the necessary adjustments to the design to incorporate local engineering standards and available components, the Canadian Valentines used a GMC engine. This engine, being an improvement over the original, was later applied to British production. In practice, Canada never used most of the 1,400 Valentines they built as they were supplied under lend-lease to the Soviet Union.

In early 1941 the 1st Tank Brigade was sent to Britain and equipped with the Matilda infantry tank. For the formation of two armoured divisions it was expected that 1,200 cruiser tanks were needed. The United Kingdom was not in a position to supply them, as it had shortfalls in supply for its own needs. This meant that Canada had to develop its own production. To this end a tank arsenal was set up under the management of a subsidiary of a US firm engaged in tank production in order to build the Ram and Grizzly tanks and their variants in Canada.

Events of the Second World War would thrust Canada into large scale tank production with thousands of Valentine, Ram, and Grizzly (Sherman) tanks and their armoured variants being produced. Canada would also go on to build modern armoured fighting vehicles that served during the Cold War, the War in Afghanistan and global peacekeeping operations.

Post-War 
In 1968, with the unification of the Canadian Army into the Canadian Armed Forces, the name of the Royal Canadian Armoured Corps was changed to simply the Armour Branch. Despite the change however, the Corps continued to use its traditional title. In 2003, Canada planned to replace all its tanks with lightweight Mobile Gun Systems. In 2007, due to experience gained during Afghanistan, Leopard tanks were purchased. As of April 2013, the traditional designation of the Royal Canadian Armoured Corps has been restored for official use.

Training

Royal Canadian Armoured Corps School
The Royal Canadian Armoured Corps School at CFB Gagetown, New Brunswick, designs and conducts tactical and technical training for armoured crewmen and officers, in addition to maintaining specialized qualifications on behalf of the Canadian Army. Crewmen and officers are trained on the Leopard 2A4 MBT, Coyote Reconnaissance Vehicle, LAV-6, and Textron Tactical Armoured Patrol Vehicle.

Tactics School
The Tactics School at CFB Gagetown develops, conducts and monitors combined-arms operations. Within a battle group context, the Tactics School focusses on tactics, techniques, and procedures at the combat team level. The Tactics School's mission is to educate and train army junior officers in the integration of combat functions at the combat team level on the tactical battlefield.

Regular Force
A doctrinal Canadian armoured regiment consists of four squadrons of medium to heavy tanks, as well as a close reconnaissance troop equipped with light tanks and/or armoured cars.

When required an armoured regiment will be tasked to provide an armoured squadron to its higher formation to provide it with a formation mounted reconnaissance capability.

Primary Reserve

Supplementary Order of Battle

Units on the Supplementary Order of Battle legally exist, but have no personnel or matériel.

Equipment
List of current vehicles operated by the RCAC include:

List of Canadian tanks and combat vehicles of the First and Second World War to present

Order of precedence

RCHA on parade without guns: (See note below)

RCHA on parade with guns: (See note below)

{{order of precedence |
  before= Royal Canadian Horse Artillery |
  title=  Royal Canadian Armoured Corps|
  after= Royal Canadian Artillery
}}Note: The honour of "The Right of the Line" (precedence over other units), on an army parade, is held by the units of the Royal Canadian Horse Artillery when on parade with their guns. On dismounted parades, RCHA units take precedence over all other land force units except formed bodies of Officer Cadets of the Royal Military College representing their college. RCA units parade to the left of units of the Royal Canadian Armoured Corps.

See also

 Royal Armoured Corps
 Royal Australian Armoured Corps
 Royal New Zealand Armoured Corps
 :Category: Armoured regiments of Canada
 Supplementary Order of Battle
 Tanks of Canada
 List of modern Canadian Army equipment
 List of infantry weapons and equipment of the Canadian military

References

Further reading
 John Marteinson and Michael R. McNorgan. The Royal Canadian Armoured Corps - An Illustrated History''. The Royal Canadian Armoured Corps Association, 2000.

External links

 The Royal Canadian Armoured Corps Association
 List of Civilian organizations with prefix "Royal" - Heritage Canada.
 List of civilian organizations with the prefix "Royal" prepared by the Department of Canadian Heritage
Canadian Forces Recruiting
Canadian Forces and Department of National Defence

Administrative corps of the Canadian Army
Canadian Armed Forces personnel branches
Nationstate armoured warfare branches
Military units and formations established in 1940
Organizations based in Canada with royal patronage
Military units and formations of Canada in World War II